Eskridge Hansford McCourt (April 21, 1909 – August 3, 1992) was the Democratic President of the West Virginia Senate from Webster County and served from 1971 to 1973.

References

1909 births
1992 deaths
West Virginia state senators
Presidents of the West Virginia State Senate
20th-century American politicians